Priyapettaval is an Indian Malayalam-language soap opera. The show premiered on 11 November 2019 in Mazhavil Manorama. It stars Avanthika Mohan, Sreelaya and Rayjan Rajan lead roles. It aired on Mazhavil Manorama and on-demand through ManoramaMax.

Cast

Main
Avanthika Mohan / Sreelaya as Dr. Uma Maheshwari
Rayjan Rajan as Dr. Balagopal (Balu)

Recurring
George as Deepan
Reshmi Boban as Maheshwari Devanarayanan (Mahi)
Manka Mahesh
Amritha Nair as Meenu
Boban Alummoodan
Dayyana Hameed
Sini Varghese
Anjo Nair
Prabha Shankar
Santhosh K

Production
The show was a comeback for actors Avantika Mohan and Rayjan Rajan who earlier played the lead roles in soap opera Aathmasakhi. Lead actress Avantika Mohan quited the show midway due to COVID-19 outbreak. Sreelaya replaced her.

References

External links
 Official website 

Indian drama television series
Indian television soap operas
Indian television series
Malayalam-language television shows
2019 Indian television series debuts
2020 Indian television series endings
Mazhavil Manorama original programming